Barber's Point Light is an inactive lighthouse on Lake Champlain in New York.

History
Barber's Point was the site of a ferry operated by Hezekiah Barber, who settled the point beginning in 1785. The Lighthouse Board requested construction of a light in 1868, but construction did not begin until 1872 due to problems acquiring title to the land. The Second Empire design used for the Colchester Reef Light (as well as others in the area) was reused, but executed in blue limestone rather than the more usual granite. Because of the light's isolation the keeper was provided with a barn in which to keep a horse.

In 1935 the light was deactivated, replaced by a much taller steel tower with an automated beacon, placed at lake's edge. The old lighthouse passed into private hands and is used for a residence. A small addition in the mid-1950s left the appearance of the building largely intact, though the roof is now painted white rather than brown.

The lighthouse is on the National Register of Historic Places as part of the Camp Dudley Road Historic District.

Notes

References

Further reading
 Oleszewski, Wes. Great Lakes Lighthouses, American and Canadian: A Comprehensive Directory/Guide to Great Lakes Lighthouses, (Gwinn, Michigan: Avery Color Studios, Inc., 1998) .
 
 U.S. Coast Guard. Historically Famous Lighthouses (Washington, D.C.: Government Printing Office, 1957).
 Wright, Larry and Wright, Patricia. Great Lakes Lighthouses Encyclopedia Hardback (Erin: Boston Mills Press, 2006) 

Lighthouses completed in 1873
Lighthouses in New York (state)
Transportation buildings and structures in Essex County, New York